Nesopupa bacca is a species of very small air-breathing land snail, a terrestrial pulmonate gastropod mollusk in the family Vertiginidae the whorl snails. This species is endemic to Hawaii in the United States.

References

Vertiginidae
Gastropods described in 1871
Molluscs of Hawaii
Taxa named by William Harper Pease
Taxonomy articles created by Polbot